HMCS Portage was a reciprocating engine-powered  built for the Royal Canadian Navy during the Second World War. Following the war, the ship saw service as a training vessel before being scrapped in 1961.

Design and description
The ships' complement consisted of 85 officers and ratings.

The reciprocating ships had two vertical triple-expansion steam engines, each driving one shaft, using steam provided by two Admiralty three-drum boilers.

The Algerine class was armed with a QF  Mk V anti-aircraft gun and four twin-gun mounts for Oerlikon 20 mm cannon. The latter guns were in short supply when the first ships were being completed and they often got a proportion of single mounts. By 1944, single-barrel Bofors 40 mm mounts began replacing the twin 20 mm mounts on a one for one basis. All of the ships were fitted for four throwers and two rails for depth charges. Many Canadian ships omitted their sweeping gear in exchange for a 24-barrel Hedgehog spigot mortar and a stowage capacity for 90+ depth charges.

Construction and career
Portage, named for Portage la Prairie, Manitoba, was laid down on 23 May 1942 by Port Arthur Shipbuilding Co. Ltd. in Port Arthur, Ontario. The ship was launched on 21 November 1942 and commissioned into the Royal Canadian Navy on 22 October 1943 at Port Arthur.

After commissioning, the minesweeper sailed up the St. Lawrence River to Halifax, where she worked up near St. Margarets Bay. After completing workups, Portage was assigned to the Western Escort Force as a convoy escort in the Battle of the Atlantic. She joined escort group W-2 as Senior Officer's Ship in January 1944. As Senior Officer Ship, the commander of the escort would be aboard her during convoy missions. In mid-April, the minesweeper transferred to escort group W-3 as Senior Officer Ship, remaining with the group until October when she was sent to Liverpool, Nova Scotia for a refit.

After working up again, Portage rejoined escort group W-3 in March 1945 and remained with them until the group's disbanding in June 1945. The ship was placed in reserve first at Sydney, Nova Scotia, then Halifax where she was paid off on 31 July 1946. Following the war, the ship was recommissioned during the summer as a training vessel in 1947-48 and then year-round from 1949–58, spending much of her time on the Great Lakes. In December 1951,  and Portage deployed to the Caribbean Sea for a training cruise, making port visits at Bermuda and Nassau. In June 1953, Wallaceburg and Portage sailed to Bermuda for a training exercise with the American submarine . On 26 September 1958, Portage was paid off for the final time and was scrapped at Sorel, Quebec in 1961.

See also
 List of ships of the Canadian Navy

References

Bibliography

External links 
 Haze Gray and Underway
 ReadyAyeReady.com

Algerine-class minesweepers of the Royal Canadian Navy
Ships built in Ontario
1942 ships
World War II minesweepers of Canada
World War II escort ships of Canada